Saremeh (also Romanized as Sāremeh) is a village in Ziabar Rural District, in the Central District of Sowme'eh Sara County, Gilan Province, Iran. At the 2006 census, its population was 311, in 76 families.

References 

Populated places in Sowme'eh Sara County